Karton (Carton) is the debut studio album by German recording artist Mark Forster. It was released by Four Music on 1 June 2012 in German-speaking Europe. Recorded in Germany, France and Spain, Forster worked with Ralf Christian Mayer on the entire album, while Sebastian Böhnisch served as co-producer. In support of the album, Forster toured with Laith Al-Deen, starting in February 2012, and released two minor successful singles, including "Auf dem Weg" and "Zu dir (Weit weg)".

Track listing

Charts

Certifications

Release history

References

External links
 MarkForster.de — official site

2012 albums
Mark Forster (singer) albums